Rowing was added to the Summer Paralympic Games competition schedule at the 2008 Beijing Games. Australia has been represented since 2008 Games.

Medal table

Medalists

2008

2012

2016

2020

Summer Paralympic Games

2008 Beijing

Representing Australia in rowing:
Single scull - Dominic Monypenny 
Double scull - John Maclean, Kathryn Ross 
Coaches - Coaches - Peter Albisser (Head Coach), Rik Bryan 
Officials - Section Manager - Adam Horner   
Rowing made its debut at the Beijing Games and Australia competed in two of the four events and won a silver medal in the double scull. 
Australia won a silver medal.

Detailed Australian Results

2012 London 

Representing Australia in rowing:
Single scull – Erik Horrie  
Pair – Gavin Bellis, Kathryn Ross 
Coach - Chad King 
Officials - Section Manager - Dean Oakman, Boat Technician – Urs Graf, Physiotherapist – Erin Smyth 

Detailed Australian Results

2016 Rio

Representing Australia in rowing:

'Men's single scull' - Erik Horrie 
Mixed double scull - Kathryn Ross (rower), Gavin Bellis, >br/>
Mixed cox four - Josephine Burnand (d) (cox), Davinia Lefroy (d), Kathleen Murdoch (d), Brock Ingram (d), Jeremy McGrath (rower) (d)
Coaches - Gordon Marcks, Tara Huntly, Jason Baker 
Officials - Team Manager - Dean Oakman,  Boatman - Chris O'Brien 

Australia qualified a boat in the Legs, Trunk and Arms Mixed Coxed Four for the first time. Erik Horrie repeated his medal success in London with a silver medal.

Detailed Australian Results

2020 Tokyo

Representing Australia in rowing:

Men's single scull - Erik Horrie 
Mixed double scull - Kathryn Ross (rower), Simon Albury, 
Mixed cox four - Tom Birtwhistle, James Talbot, Nikki Ayers, Alexandra Viney, Renae Domaschenz (cox) 
Coaches - Elizabeth Chapman, Lincoln Handley, Jason Baker 
Officials- Team Leader - Gordon Marcks, Physiotherapist - Sarah Hammond   

Erik Horrie repeated his medal success in London and Rio with a silver medal.

Detailed Australian Results

See also
Rowing at the Summer Paralympics
 Australia at the Paralympics

References 

Paralympic rowers of Australia
Rowing at the Summer Paralympics
Australian Paralympic teams
Rowing in Australia